The OAW C.I was a German reconnaissance aircraft prototype of World War I.

Design
The OAW C.I was built at the Albatros Schneidemühl factory, powered by a Benz Bz.III engine delivering . It had provisions for two crew, a pilot and an observer.

References

C.01
1910s German military reconnaissance aircraft
Single-engined tractor aircraft
Aircraft first flown in 1915